Lensbaby is a line of camera lenses for DSLR and mirrorless cameras that combine a simple lens with a bellows or ball and socket mechanism for use in special-effect photography.  A lensbaby can give effects normally associated with view cameras. The lenses are for use in selective focus photography and bokeh effects.

Overview

Lensbaby lenses can be used with most cameras that accept interchangeable lenses, mainly DSLR, SLR, mirrorless, 35mm film and PL mount motion cameras.

The focus front standard can be manipulated off axis to move the sharpest area of Focus (called the "sweet spot") to almost anywhere in the frame. This allows the important part of the subject to be rendered fairly sharp with everything else out of focus, even if it is the same distance from the camera. The Lensbaby naturally focuses at approximately 2 feet; closer focus is achieved by pushing the front of the lens out, and infinity focus is achieved by pulling the front of the lens toward the base of the lens. There is extreme spherical and some chromatic aberration outside the central "sweet spot". Lensbaby lenses have no electronic components, disabling auto-focus when mounted on modern cameras. The use of auto-focus is further undermined by the spherical aberration in the lens. In most cases Lensbaby lenses require aperture priority or fully manual mode. The Lensbaby can also be used for infrared photography, but does not include an index mark for infrared photography.

History
Craig Strong, a professional photographer from Portland Oregon, invented the first Lensbaby lens by combining a vacuum cleaner hose body and a large format speed graphic lens. Strong redesigned the original prototype. He then partnered with entrepreneur Sam Pardue to form Lensbabies, LLC. The Original Lensbaby was launched in 2004 at the WPPI tradeshow. Images taken with the Original Lensbaby featured a 'sweet spot' of sharp focus surrounded by directional blur. This effect was achieved through the use of a single element lens. The Original Lensbaby used interchangeable drop-in apertures held in by a rubber o-ring.

In 2005 Lensbaby released the Lensbaby 2.0 an upgrade to the Original Lensbaby which featured a sharper, brighter optic, creating greater contrast between areas of blur and sharpness. The Lensbaby 2.0 used interchangeable aperture disks that levitated in front of the optic using magnets.

In 2006 Lensbaby introduced the Lensbaby 3G which used a threaded rod system in combination with a locking mechanism to allow the flexible lens body to be locked into place for repeatable results.

In 2007, the Lensbaby 3GPL was launched, allowing cinematographers to use Lensbaby lenses on motion picture cameras.

Optic swap introduction and multiple lens bodies 
In 2008, Lensbaby released three lenses, the Composer, Muse and Control Freak that worked in combination with interchangeable optics. The Muse featured flexible bellows and was similar in design to the Lensbaby 2.0. The Control Freak was an update on the Lensbaby 3G. The Composer introduced a new ball and socket design, which allowed the user to swivel the lens to move the sweet spot. Concurrently, four interchangeable optics were released to be used in conjunction with the Composer, Muse and Control Freak.

In 2010, Scout, the first straight-bodied Lensbaby lens, was released. It featured a 12mm Fisheye optic.

In 2011, Composer Pro, an upgraded version of the Composer was released. Composer Pro was sold with the Sweet 35 optic, a "sweet spot" selective focus optic. Sweet 35 was the first Lensbaby optic to feature internal apertures. It was followed in 2012 by another optic with internal apertures, the Edge 80 optic. The Edge 80 optic produced a slice of sharp focus surrounded by smooth blur, similar to the effect created by a tilt-shift lens.

In 2015, the company introduced the Velvet 56. https://www.dpreview.com/products/lensbaby/lenses/lensbaby_velvet56/overview This lens featured a singlet-doublet-singlet optical design the company claimed evoked the optical imperfections of lenses manufactured in the mid-1900s.

In a departure from its previous mount-plus-optic model, in 2014 Lensbaby introduced the Circular Fisheye lens, which was a complete, stand-alone lens in a single unit.  In 2015 Lensbaby introduced another complete lens, the Velvet 56, a 56mm lens capable of 1:1 macro and, by incorporation intentional spherical aberration, more at larger apertures and less as the lens is closed down, the lens also provides a soft focus effect.

Products

Lens bodies
Lensbaby lenses mount directly onto SLR or mirrorless camera bodies. They have interchangeable drop in optics. Currently the lineup of lenses come with an optic installed.

Composer ProThe Composer Pro lensbody operates on a ball and socket and allows photographers to use selective focus on a tilted plane. This lens body comes with either a 50mm multi-coated optical glass doublet with drop in aperture, 35mm 4 multi-coated glass optic with 12-blade adjustable aperture or with Edge 80 Optic with 80mm focal length.

Spark
The Spark is the newest iteration of the Original Lensbaby. It contains a fixed 5.6 aperture optic and uses selective focus to create a center of focus surrounded by gradually increasing blur. It comes in either a Canon EF or Nikon F mount.

Muse
The Muse has a design similar to the Original Lensbaby and the 2.0. Its simple design consists of an interchangeable optic attached to a flexible tube bellows. The user both focuses and moves the area in focus by squeezing and bending the lens.  It does not hold position and
requires the photographer to maintain the focus manually.
The Muse is available with a multi-coated glass optical doublet installed, and comes with f/2.8, f/4, f/5.6, and f/8 aperture disks.  It is compatible with 35mm cameras and PL mount.

Scout
The Scout does not have selective focus control and is intended for use as a traditional fisheye lens with a very close minimum focus distance.

Optics
Lensbaby produces 8 different interchangeable drop in optics. Each optic has a varied effect, ranging from a sharp slice of focus, soft focus to pinhole photography.

Edge 80
The Edge 80 is an 80mm drop-in optic with adjustable aperture. Its aperture ranges from f/2.8-f/22 and it has a flat field of focus. The minimum focusing distance of this optic is approximately 17 inches when the optic is extended forward and fully tilted. Its maximum focusing distance is infinity. The Lensbaby Macro Converters screw on in between the optic and lens, it is incompatible with current 37mm Lensbaby accessories.

Sweet 35
The Sweet 35 is a 35mm drop in optic with adjustable aperture. Its aperture ranges from f/2.5−f/22 with a selective spot of focus. It focuses approximately 7.5" to infinity from the front of the optic. The Lensbaby Macro Converters screw on in between the optic and lens, it is incompatible with current 37mm Lensbaby accessories.

Soft Focus
The Soft Focus is a 50mm drop in optic with swappable aperture disks that range from f/2 up to f/22.

Fisheye
The Fisheye is a 12mm drop in optic with swappable aperture disks that range from f/5.6 to f/22. This optic has a 160 degree of view and focuses from .5" from the front of the optic to infinity.

Double Glass
The Double Glass is a 50mm drop-in optic with magnetic swappable aperture disks. The lens glass is a low dispersion, high refractive index, multi-coated optical glass doublet.

Optic Kit
The Optic Kit contains three separate drop-in optics with four separate effects.
 Single Glass
 Plastic
 Pinhole/Zone Plate

Accessories
Lensbaby sells wide angle, telephoto and macro adapters that screw onto the 37mm threads.  In March 2011, Lensbaby introduced seven optics that a user can swap into and out of any of the in-production Lensbaby lenses
Among the new products was a plastic optic capable of producing the distortion and chromatic aberration familiar to Holga and LOMO users, a fisheye lens, a pinhole for infinite depth of field, zoneplate optic for very soft-focus effects, and an uncoated glass singlet.

Macro Converters
The Macro Converters are a set of one 8mm converter and one 16mm converter. The 8mm converter allows a user to focus from 0"-8.13" while the 16mm lets a user focus from 2.25"-6", when stacked they become a 24mm converter which allows a user to focus from 1.63" to 5".

Accessory Kit
The Lensbaby Accessory Kit contains four accessories that at one point were sold separately but now (with the exception of the Creative Aperture Kit) are limited to purchase in a kit.
Macro Lenses
+4 lens
+10 lens
0.46x Wide Angle Converter
1.6 Telephoto Converter
Creative Aperture Kit

Each item in the kit is compatible with all Lensbaby optics except for the Sweet 35, Edge 80, Spark and Pinhole/Zone Plate.

Creative Aperture Kit
The Creative Aperture Kit are disks that drop into Lensbaby's all non-adjustable aperture optics. The kit is sold as either pre-cut shapes (birds, diamonds, heart, dripsplat, slots, star, swirly, sunburst, whirlpool) or blanks.

0.42x Super Wide Angle
The 0.42x Super Wide Angle converter screws onto the 37mm threads of most Lensbaby optics except for the Sweet 35, Edge 80, Spark and Pinhole/Zone Plate. The converter also has 52mm threads for 52mm filters and step up rings.

Step Up/ShadeThe Step Up/Shade was created to fill the gap of Lensbaby lenses incompatibility with standard step-up rings. This Step Up/Shade is 37-52mm and will fit on any of Lensbaby's 37mm threaded optics and allows for any 52mm filter to be screwed onto the front of the Step Up/Shade.

Discontinued products 
Original Lensbaby
The Original Lensbaby is a flexible camera lens that creates an image that has an area of sharp focus surrounded by graduated blur. The lens is the initial springboard for the products to follow, the initial principal of shifting in the in-focus area by bending the flexible lens tube in any direction.

Specs of the Original Lensbaby
50mm focal length
Manual Focus
Fixed optical glass element
Drop in aperture (f2.8, f/4, f/5.6, f/8)
7" Minimum focusing distance
2.25x2.5, 3.5oz

2.0
The 2.0 is the second generation of Lensbaby lenses, it improved on the initial design of the Original Lensbaby by adding additional apertures and improvement in the optical glass doublet. 

'Specs of the 2.0'
Coated, high refractive index, low dispersion optical glass doublet
50mm focal length
Manual focus
drop in aperture (f/2-f.8)
10" minimum focusing distance
2.25" x 2.5", 3.6oz

3G
The 3G is a third generation selective focus SLR lens from Lensbaby. It is an upgraded version of the 2.0 with additions of three focusing rails that emerge from the camera mount and pass through the focusing collar. There is a trigger button on the focusing collar that releases three pins that engage the focusing rails and lock the 3G in a bent position. Once the lens is locked in place, additional fine focus can be achieved by turning the barrel focusing ring which moves the optic in and out like a normal manual focus lens. While the lens is locked the three focusing rails can be adjusted to move the sweet spot around the image.

Specs of the 3G
Coated optical glass doublet (the same optic as Lensbaby 2.0)
50mm focal length
37mm filter size
12" minimum focusing distance
3"(7.62 cm) x 3.25"(8.89 cm) wide, 5.7oz(161.6g)
drop in aperture (f/2-f/22)

Control Freak
The Control Freak was modeled after the 3G, the lens allows the user to compress and bend the lens and then lock it in place once the desired focus is achieved. Once in locked position the focus can be adjusted with the three posts and the barrel focusing ring.

Specs of Control Freak
Drop-in Double Glass optic
Manual/Fingertip Focus
Drop in aperture disks (f/2-f/22)
Minimum Focus from 9"(23 cm)
Maximum Focus to infinity
2.25"(5.7 cm) x 2.5"(6.35 cm), 3.7oz(104.9g)

Composer
The Composer was the first Lensbaby lens to feature a ball-and-socket style body coupled with a manual barrel focus.  Unlike the original design, the lens stays in position with a locking ring around the base. 
The Composer's stability also allows for the long exposures usually needed for pinhole photography.

Specs of the Composer
Drop-in Double Glass optic
Drop in aperture disks (f/2.8-f/22)
Minimum Focus from 18"(45 cm)
Maximum Focus to infinity
2.25"(5.7 cm) x 2.5"(6.35 cm), 3.7oz(104.9g)
Manual Focus

Compatibility

Lens body mount compatibility 
Lensbaby lenses are compatible with a variety of products and are sold with various third party mounts. The chart below visualizes the available combinations of Lensbaby lenses and third party camera bodies in existence.
*discontinued

Camera compatibility

Nikon

Canon

Sony/Minolta A-mount
 *Camera body needs to have the shutter lock mechanism turned off in order to function with a Lensbaby lens.

Leica

PL/Motion Picture
In order to use a Lensbaby with your digital video camera, you will need to use an adapter. The following companies make adapters which have been tested and used successfully with a Lensbaby: P+S Technik, Redrock M2, Brevis35, Letus35 and SGpro. To use an adapter with the PL mount Lensbaby, you will need to choose an adapter that will attach to your camera (has the correct thread size, for example 72mm or 82mm) and features a PL Mount on the other end. You can also use an adapter with a digital video camera and an SLR mount Lensbaby; in this case you will need to choose an adapter that will attach to your camera and features an SLR (for example, Nikon) Mount on the other end.

Olympus
*Please note: The Composer with Tilt Transformer is not compatible with the Olympus OM-D E-M5.

Panasonic

Product comparison

Optic Swap System 
The Lensbaby Optic Swap system makes it possible to change the look and feel of digital images by changing out the optic instead of the lens. With the exception of the Sweet 35 and Edge 80 optics, the optic swap tool which is included with every optic as the lid of the optic case. The tool must be aligned with the notches of the optic and twisted counterclockwise to remove the optic.
The Sweet 35 and Edge 80 optics are inserted by aligning them with the dot on the lensbody and twisting it into the locked position. To remove them, push the optic into the lensbody and turn to release it.

Product effects 
Lensbaby products vary in the effects they produce, the table below illustrates the diversity of creative options that can be obtained when using the Lensbaby system.

 *Discontinued

Selective focus
Most Lensbaby products utilize a technique called selective focus. With a traditional lens, this technique requires coming close to the photograph's subject and opening the camera lens to a wide aperture. This gives a shallow depth of field and creates a look where the main subject is sharp and everything in the front and back of it is blurred. With Lensbaby lenses and optics the selective focus becomes moveable and acts as a spot of focus on one main object, and unlike traditional techniques, objects at the same DOF will also be out of focus if so desired by the user.

Sweet Spot versus Slice 
With the exception of the Soft Focus optic, Fisheye optic, Edge optics and Pinhole/Zone Plate, Lensbaby products traditionally create a sharp round spot of focus with a ring of blur that transcends. The Edge optics creates a different effect similar to a traditional tilt shift lens DOF. The Edge creates a moveable, linear 'slice' of focus which transcends typical DOF and creates sharp focus from edge to edge in a slice of an image while blurring out the rest of the image.

Creative apertures 
Playing off of the utilization of drop in apertures that The Original Lensbaby started, Lensbaby released the ability to create custom drop in apertures. Traditional aperture disks came standard with different sized holes cut into the center, which could be swapped out with a magnetic aperture tool. Because of this the ability to add customized disks was a natural progression of the original concept. Lensbaby offers precut disks in various shapes that had been selected in a contest. Current shapes offered in the custom kit are; swirl, birds, sunburst, splat, flower, heart, star, waves, slats. Blank disks are also still offered at this time by the company.

Tilt
With the exception of Scout and the stand-alone lenses, Lensbaby allow photographers to tilt the lens moving the selective focus spot around to the desired location. Unlike a tilt shift lens, Lensbaby does not shift perspective, but simply changes the plane of focus.

In movies and TV shows 
Lensbaby products have been used in the following films, television shows.

Movies
The Diving Bell and Butterfly
Much Ado About Nothing (2012)
Terms and Conditions May Apply
Contagion
The Raven
I Melt With You
How The Fire Fell
Blind Massage

TV
Enlightened
Dollhouse
House
Californication
Wilfred
Revenge
FlashForward
CSI
Sherlock
The Forgotten

Shorts

Last Day Dream

See also
 Perspective control lens
 View camera

References

External links 
 Official site
 Camera and Lens Mount Information
 Lensbaby example pictures (via flickr)
 Last Day Dream [HD]  Chris Milk's film short – filmed entirely with a Lensbaby.
 Lensbaby Test Footage [HD] ThinkBig Test Footage of Lensbaby Muse on RedOne Camera

Photographic lenses